Nosmo King is an album by guitarist John Abercrombie and pianist Andy LaVerne, recorded in late 1991 and released on the Danish label SteepleChase.

Track listing
 "I Hear a Rhapsody" (George Fragos, Jack Baker, Dick Gasparre) – 6:35
 "Waltz for Debby" (Bill Evans) – 6:13
 "I Loves You, Porgy" (George Gershwin, Ira Gershwin) – 8:57
 "Blue Cycle" (Andy LaVerne) – 8:57
 "Silver's Serenade" (Horace Silver) – 6:24
 "John's New Waltz" (John Abercrombie) – 5:35
 "Babes w/Babies" (LaVerne) – 6:54
 "My Man's Gone Now" (George Gershwin, DuBose Heyward) – 7:54
 "Nosmo King" (LaVerne) – 5:47
 "Never Never Land" (Jule Styne, Betty Comdenl, Adolph Green) – 7:45
 "Softly, as in a Morning Sunrise" (Sigmund Romberg, Oscar Hammerstein II) – 6:03

Personnel
John Abercrombie – guitar
Andy LaVerne – piano

References

 

John Abercrombie (guitarist) albums
Andy LaVerne albums
1992 albums
SteepleChase Records albums